Sir Francis Adams Hyett (1844–1941) was chairman of Gloucestershire County Council from 1918 to 1920.

Early life and family
Francis Hyett was born in Painswick House in 1844, the son of William Henry Hyett. He was educated at Eton College, and matriculated at Trinity Hall, Cambridge in 1864, graduating B.A. in 1868. He was called to the bar at the Inner Temple in 1872, and worked as a conveyancer.

Career
Hyett was a co-founder of the Marling School in Stroud.

Hyett was chairman of Gloucestershire County Council from 1918 to 1920.

From 1895 to 1937, he served as chairman of Barnwood House Hospital, a private Mental Asylum in the outskirts of Gloucester. His Father was instrumental in the founding of the hospital in Barnwood and was its first chairman.

Death and legacy
Hyett died in 1941. His portrait by Hugh Goldwin Riviere is in Gloucester Shire Hall.

Selected publications
Gloucester and her Governor during the Great Civil War. A lecture, etc. John Bellows, Gloucester, 1891.
The Civil War in the Forest of Dean, 1643-1645. 1895.
The Painswick Annual Register. Jan. 1890-Dec. 1899. A decade of parochial history. Gloucester, 1900. (compiler)
Florence. Her History and Art to the Fall of the Republic. Methuen, London, 1903.
An Octet of Sonnets by F. A. H. With Christmas Greetings from the Author. Essex House Press, Chipping Campden, 1905.
Gloucester in National History. John Bellows, Gloucester; Kegan Paul & Co., London; 1906.
Chattertoniana, Being a Classified Catalogue of Books, Pamphlets, Magazine Articles, & Other Printed Matter Relating to the Life or Works of Chatterton, or to the Rowley Controversy. John Bellows, Gloucester, 1914. (With William Bazeley)
Glimpses of the History of Painswick, with a Bibliography of its Literature. John Bellows, Gloucester, 1928.

References

Further reading
Austin, Roland. (1949?) Catalogue of Gloucestershire books collected by Sir Francis Hyett of Painswick and placed in the Shire Hall. Gloucester.

1844 births
1941 deaths
People educated at Eton College
Alumni of Trinity Hall, Cambridge
Hyett family
English knights
People from Gloucestershire
Historians of Gloucestershire
English non-fiction writers
English antiquarians